Laila Ferrer e Silva Domingos (born 30 July 1982 in Pacatuba, Ceará) is a Brazilian javelin thrower. She competed in the javelin throw event at the 2012 Summer Olympics. She competed at the 2020 Summer Olympics.

In December 2012, she married hammer thrower Wagner Domingos.

Personal bests
Javelin throw: 62.52 m –  São Bernardo do Campo, 11 June 2017

Competition record

References

External links

Sports reference biography

Brazilian female javelin throwers
1982 births
Living people
Olympic athletes of Brazil
Pan American Games athletes for Brazil
Athletes (track and field) at the 2011 Pan American Games
Athletes (track and field) at the 2012 Summer Olympics
Athletes (track and field) at the 2020 Summer Olympics
Athletes (track and field) at the 2015 Pan American Games
Athletes (track and field) at the 2019 Pan American Games
South American Games gold medalists for Brazil
South American Games bronze medalists for Brazil
South American Games medalists in athletics
Competitors at the 2014 South American Games
Athletes (track and field) at the 2018 South American Games
South American Championships in Athletics winners
South American Games gold medalists in athletics
Troféu Brasil de Atletismo winners
Sportspeople from Ceará
21st-century Brazilian women